Alexander Gamburd is a mathematician at the City University of New York known for his work in spectral problems in number theory, probability, and Arithmetic combinatorics. He is a Presidential Professor of Mathematics at the CUNY Graduate Center.

Life and career
Gamburd earned his B.S degree in mathematics from the Massachusetts Institute of Technology in 1993. He received his M.A. (1994) and Ph.D. (1999) from Princeton University, where his advisor was Peter Sarnak. In 2004, Gamburd became assistant professor of mathematics at the University of California, Santa Cruz and was promoted to full professor in 2008. He was a visiting scholar at the Institute for Advanced Study from 2005 to 2006 and from 2007 to 2008. In 2011, Gamburd joined the faculty of the CUNY Graduate Center, City University of New York as Presidential Professor of Mathematics.

Awards and honors
In 2007, Gamburd received a Sloan Research Fellowship.
In 2007, he received an NSF CAREER Award.
In 2008, he won a Presidential Early Career Award.

Selected publications
Bourgain, Jean; Gamburd, Alexander. "Uniform expansion bounds for Cayley graphs of SL2(Fp)". Annals of Mathematics 167 (2008), 625-642. MR 2415383
Breuillard, Emmanuel; Gamburd, Alexander. "Strong uniform expansion in SL(2,p)". Geometric and Functional Analysis 20 (2010), no. 5, 1201-1209. MR 2746951
Bourgain, Jean; Gamburd, Alexander; Sarnak, Peter. "Generalization of Selberg's 3/16 theorem and affine sieve". Acta Mathematica 207 (2011), no. 2, 255–290. MR 2892611
Bourgain, Jean; Gamburd, Alexander; Sarnak, Peter. "Markoff triples and strong approximation". Comptes Rendus Mathématique. Académie des Sciences. Paris 354 (2016), no. 2, 131-135. MR 3456887

References 

Living people
20th-century American mathematicians
21st-century American mathematicians
Massachusetts Institute of Technology School of Science alumni
Princeton University alumni
Institute for Advanced Study visiting scholars
Graduate Center, CUNY faculty
City University of New York faculty
Sloan Research Fellows
Mathematicians from New York (state)
Year of birth missing (living people)
Recipients of the Presidential Early Career Award for Scientists and Engineers